The Federal-Aid Highway Act of 1952 authorized $550 million for the Interstate Highway System on a 50–50 matching basis, meaning the federal government paid 50% of the cost of building and maintaining the interstate while each individual state paid the balance for interstate roads within their borders.

Analysis
These were the first funds authorized specifically for Interstate construction. However, it was a token amount, reflecting the continuing disagreements within the highway community rather than the national importance of the system.

See also
Federal Aid Highway Act of 1956

References

Interstate Highway System
1952 in the United States